André Geerts (18 December 1955 – 27 July 2010) was a Belgian comics creator best known for his series Jojo.

Biography
André Geerts was born in Brussels in 1955. He studied at the Institut Saint-Luc art school in Brussels. He started working for Le Soir Jeunesse (the youth supplement of newspaper Le Soir) in 1974, when he was only 18 years old, before joining the Franco-Belgian comics magazine Spirou. His success series Jojo, about the small scale, real life but humoristic adventures of a boy of seven years old, started in 1983, with on average one new album a year. Jojo was adapted to the animated television special Jojo: The Violet Mystery in 2000, and a series was under development. He also created later on Mademoiselle Louise, about a girl of about the same age as Jojo, but who is extremely rich and lonely.

Geerts died in 2010 from cancer.

Bibliography
Jojo, 17 volumes, 1983–2010, Dupuis (volume 18 appears in October 2010)
Monde cruel, 2 volumes, 1985–1997, Dupuis
Jabert contre l'adversité, 1 volume, 1990, written by Pierre Le Gall, Delcourt
Le Commissaire Martin, 1995, 1 volume, Editions Point Image – JVDH
Mademoiselle Louise, 4 volumes, written by Sergio Salma, Casterman, later Dupuis

Awards
1980: Prix Saint-Michel for best comical artist
1994: Oecumenic Jury Award at the Angoulême International Comics Festival for the first volume of Mademoiselle Louise
1997: Grand Prix of the city of Durbuy for Monde Cruel
1998: Crayon d'or (Golden Pencil) of the city of Brussels, awarded by the Belgian Chamber of Comic Experts
2003: Grand prix of the city of Brussels, awarded at the festival of Ganshoren
2003: Prix Saint-Michel for best French language youth comic for Jojo
2007: Prize of the Young Readers at the Festival of Vaison-la-Romaine for Jojo 16: Jojo vétérinaire
2007: nominated for the Prix Saint-Michel for best youth comic for Jojo 16: Jojo vétérinaire
2008: nominated for the Prix Saint-Michel for best youth comic for Jojo 17: Confisqué

Notes

External links
Biography from his publisher Dupuis
Biography at Lambiek's Comiclopedia
Info on the author and the series Jojo from the 1994 exposition at the Belgian Centre for Comic Strip Art

1955 births
2010 deaths
Artists from Brussels
Belgian comics artists
Belgian comics writers